Mary Britton Miller (6 August 1883 – 3 April 1975), best known as Isabel Bolton, was an American poet and novelist.

Born in New London, Connecticut, to Charles P. Miller, a lawyer, and Grace Rumrill, she had an identical twin sister, Grace, as well as an older sister and two brothers. Her parents died of cholera when she was four years old. She grew up in Massachusetts, where her twin sister drowned when she was fourteen.

She later lived in Europe and when moving back to the United States at the age of 28, settled in New York City, living for many years in Greenwich Village until her death in 1975.

She was first known as a writer of poetry for adults and children, publishing books under her birth name. In 1943, when she was sixty, she published her first novel, In the Days of Thy Youth. She adopted the pen name Isabel Bolton for Do I Wake or Sleep, a novel which received positive attention from literary critics Edmund Wilson and Diana Trilling. This was followed by The Christmas Tree in 1949. Her 1952 novel Many Mansions was nominated for the National Book Award for Fiction. These first three novels as Isabel Bolton were republished in 1997 in a collection called New York Mosaic.

Books
 As Mary Britton Miller:
Songs of Infancy and Other Poems (Macmillan, 1928), poetry
Menagerie (Macmillan, 1928), children's poetry
Without Sanctuary (Macmillan, 1932), poetry
Intrepid Bird (Macmillan, 1934), poetry
In the Days of Thy Youth (Scribner, 1943), novel
The Crucifixion: A Poem (Scribner, 1944), poetry
Give a Guess: Poems (Pantheon, 1957), children's poetry, illustrated by Juliet Kepes
All Aboard: Poems (Pantheon, 1958), children's poetry, illustrated by Bill Sokol
A Handful of Flowers (Pantheon, 1959), children's poetry, illustrated by Genevieve Vaughan-Jackson
Jungle Journey (Pantheon, 1959), children's poetry, illustrated by Tobias Schneebaum
Listen—the Birds (Pantheon, 1961), children's poetry, illustrated by Evaline Ness
 As Isabel Bolton:
Do I Wake or Sleep (Scribner, 1946)
The Christmas Tree (Scribner, 1949)
Many Mansions (Scribner, 1952)
Under Gemini: A Memoir (Harcourt Brace, 1966)
The Whirligig of Time (Crown Publishers, 1971)
New York Mosaic (Steerforth Press, 1997), posthumous collection of Do I Wake or Sleep, The Christmas Tree, and Many Mansions

References

20th-century American novelists
American women novelists
1883 births
1975 deaths
20th-century American women writers